The Milwaukee Brewers' 1993 season involved the Brewers' finishing 7th in the American League East with a record of 69 wins and 93 losses.

Offseason
 November 17, 1992: Dante Bichette was traded by the Brewers to the Colorado Rockies for Kevin Reimer.
 November 20, 1992: Josías Manzanillo was signed as a free agent by the Brewers.
 January 13, 1993: Bill Doran was purchased by the Milwaukee Brewers from the Cincinnati Reds.

Regular season

Season standings

Record vs. opponents

Transactions
 April 14, 1993: Tim McIntosh was selected off waivers from the Brewers by the Montreal Expos.
 April 26, 1993: Mike Boddicker was purchased by the Brewers from the Kansas City Royals.
 June 1, 1993: Juan Bell was selected off waivers by the Brewers from the Philadelphia Phillies.
 June 5, 1993: Dane Johnson was signed as a free agent by the Brewers.
 June 12, 1993: Josías Manzanillo was traded by the Milwaukee Brewers to the New York Mets for Wayne Housie.

Draft picks
 June 3, 1993: Jeff D'Amico was drafted by the Brewers in the 1st round (23rd pick) of the 1993 Major League Baseball draft. Player signed August 25, 1993.

Roster

Player stats

Batting

Starters by position
Note: Pos = Position; G = Games played; AB = At bats; H = Hits; Avg. = Batting average; HR = Home runs; RBI = Runs batted in

Other batters
Note: G = Games played; AB = At bats; H = Hits; Avg. = Batting average; HR = Home runs; RBI = Runs batted in

Pitching

Starting pitchers
Note: G = Games pitched; IP = Innings pitched; W = Wins; L = Losses; ERA = Earned run average; SO = Strikeouts

Other pitchers
Note: G = Games pitched; IP = Innings pitched; W = Wins; L = Losses; ERA = Earned run average; SO = Strikeouts

Relief pitchers
Note: G = Games pitched; W = Wins; L = Losses; SV = Saves; ERA = Earned run average; SO = Strikeouts

Farm system

The Brewers' farm system consisted of seven minor league affiliates in 1993.

References

1993 Milwaukee Brewers team at Baseball-Reference
1993 Milwaukee Brewers team page at www.baseball-almanac.com

Milwaukee Brewers seasons
Milwaukee Brewers season
Milwaukee Brew